The 2000 United States presidential election in Georgia took place on November 7, 2000, and was part of the 2000 United States presidential election. Voters chose 13 representatives, or electors to the Electoral College, who voted for president and vice president.

Georgia was won by Governor George W. Bush (R-TX) by an 11.7% margin of victory. He won a majority of the popular vote, counties, and congressional districts. Bush dominated in most of the rural parts of the state, but Vice President Al Gore (D-TN) did well in highly-populated Fulton; and majority-Black DeKalb and Clayton counties of the Metro Atlanta area. Within that area are the 4th and 5th congressional districts, which are the only two districts Gore won. Author and investment analyst Harry Browne (L-TN) would finish third in the popular vote in Georgia.

In 1992 and 1996, Georgia was the first and third closest state, respectively. In 2000, however, Georgia was not a close state at all, as the Democratic candidate, who happened to then be the vice president, did not do as well as Bill Clinton in the general election. In other down-ballot races, Zell Miller (D), who was appointed by then-Governor Roy Barnes (D) following Senator Paul Coverdell's (R) death in July 2000, won the special election for the unexpired remainder of the term. Another notable down ballot race was the 2000 U.S. House election in Georgia's 2nd congressional district in which Incumbent U.S. Representative Sanford Bishop (D) survived a strong challenge from Dylan Glenn (R). Miller in the Senate race actually outperformed Gore in the presidential race by over 30 points.  The state was also 1 of 14 that Bill Clinton carried at least once during the elections of 1992 and 1996 (having carried it in 1992) that Gore lost, whom at the time of the election was the sitting Vice President under Clinton.

, this is the last election in which Chatham County voted Republican and the last in which McIntosh County, Meriwether County, Mitchell County, Telfair County, and Wilkinson County voted Democratic.

Results

By county

Counties that flipped from Democratic to Republican
Atkinson (Largest city: Pearson)
Baldwin (Largest city: Milledgeville)
Ben Hill (Largest city: Fitzgerald)
Berrien (Largest city: Nashville)
Brooks (Largest city: Quitman)
Butts (Largest city: Jackson)
Chatham (Largest city: Savannah)
Chattooga (Largest city: Summerville)
Clinch (Largest city: Homerville)
Cook (Largest city: Adel)
Crawford (Largest city: Roberta)
Crisp (Largest city: Cordele)
Decatur (Largest city: Bainbridge)
Dodge (Largest city: Eastman)
Early (Largest city: Blakely)
Elbert (Largest city: Elberton)
Emanuel (Largest city: Swainsboro)
Grady (Largest city: Cairo)
Greene (Largest city: Greensboro)
Hart (Largest city: Hartwell)
Heard (Largest city: Franklin)
Irwin (Largest city: Ocilla)
Jasper (Largest city: Monticello)
Jenkins (Largest city: Millen)
Johnson (Largest city: Wrightsville)
Lamar (Largest city: Barnesville)
Lanier (Largest city: Lakeland)
Long (Largest city: Ludowici)
Marion (Largest city: Buena Vista)
Miller (Largest city: Colquitt)
Montgomery (Largest city: Mount Vernon)
Polk (Largest city: Cedartown)
Pulaski (Largest city: Hawkinsville)
Putnam (Largest city: Eatonton)
Schley (Largest city: Ellaville)
Screven (Largest city: Sylvania)
Seminole (Largest city: Donalsonville)
Sumter (Largest city: Americus)
Taylor (Largest city: Butler)
Treutlen (Largest city: Soperton)
Turner (Largest city: Ashburn)
Wheeler (Largest city: Alamo)
Wilcox (Largest city: Abbeville)
Wilkes (Largest city: Washington)

By congressional district
Bush won 9 of 11 congressional districts, including one held by a Democrat.

Electors 

Technically the voters of Georgia cast their ballots for electors: representatives to the Electoral College. Georgia is allocated 13 electors because it has 11 congressional districts and 2 senators. All candidates who appear on the ballot or qualify to receive write-in votes must submit a list of 13 electors, who pledge to vote for their candidate and his or her running mate. Whoever wins the majority of votes in the state is awarded all 13 electoral votes. Their chosen electors then vote for president and vice president. Although electors are pledged to their candidate and running mate, they are not obligated to vote for them. An elector who votes for someone other than his or her candidate is known as a faithless elector.

The electors of each state and the District of Columbia met on December 18, 2000 to cast their votes for president and vice president. The Electoral College itself never meets as one body. Instead the electors from each state and the District of Columbia met in their respective capitols.

The following were the members of the Electoral College from the state. All were pledged to and voted for George W. Bush and Dick Cheney:
Anna Cablik
Teresa Jeter Chappell
Charles Commander Clay
Fred Cooper
James Edenfield
Winnie LeClercq
B.J. Lopez
Carolyn Dodgen Meadows
Alec Poitevint
Eric Tanenblatt
Cynthia Teasley
Virgil Williams
Bob Young

References 

2000 Georgia (U.S. state) elections
Georgia
2000